Jim Holt (born October 30, 1954) is an American journalist, author in popular science and essayist. He has contributed to The New York Times, The New York Times Magazine, The New York Review of Books, The New Yorker, The American Scholar, and Slate. In 1997, he was editor of The New Leader, a political magazine. His book Why Does the World Exist? was a NYTimes bestseller for 2013.

Career
Holt hosted a weekly radio spot on BBC Wales called "Living in America, with Jim Holt" for ten years. He has appeared on William F. Buckley's Firing Line, NBC News with Tom Brokaw, CNN, and had a brief appearance in an episode of Billy on the Street in which he ended an impromptu interview after the interviewer insisted he reveal his sexuality.

Awards and honors 
 2012 National Book Critics Circle Award, finalist, Why Does the World Exist?
 2012 The Philosophers Magazine named his book, Why Does the World Exist? as one of the best books of 2012.

Publications 
 Stop Me If You've Heard This: A History and Philosophy of Jokes New York: W.W. Norton, 2008. , 
 Why Does the World Exist?: An Existential Detective Story London: Profile, 2011. , 
 When Einstein Walked With Gödel: Excursions to the Edge of Thought Farrar, Straus & Giroux, 2018. ,

References

External links 
 
 Books of the Times – Into the Nothing, After Something
 The New York Review of Books – What Can You Really Know?
 "The Power of Catastrophic Thinking", Holt's review of The Precipice: Existential Risk and the Future of Humanity in The New York Review of Books
 Philosopher Jim Holt on Nothingness, the God Wars, and His New Book: “I’m a Little Unhinged”
 Has the Meaning of Nothing Changed?
 The Philosophers Magazine – The best books of 2012
 
 Jim Holt, Charlie Rose, January 8, 2012 

21st-century American philosophers
American metaphysics writers
Writers from New York (state)
Living people
Place of birth missing (living people)
American male essayists
21st-century American essayists
21st-century American male writers
1954 births